Naomi Faye Battrick (born 11 April 1991) is an English actress.

Career
She was born in Kettering, Northamptonshire and her first television appearance was in a guest role on The Bill as Miranda Roscoe, following which she won the part of 15-year-old band member Toyah Swann in the 2009 CBBC show My Almost Famous Family, for which she is predominantly known, starring alongside Dominique Moore and Rakie Ayola. It revolved around a family band who were part of a chat show. The series ended in November 2009. Following this, Battrick made guest and recurring appearances on television shows including Casualty and as Grace Jacobs in Doctors, for which she is also predominantly known. She has also appeared in films, including the 2012 thriller film Blood as Miriam Fairburn. In January 2014, she joined the cast of BBC One school drama Waterloo Road where she appeared as the new girl Gabriella Wark, and in 2015 signed on for the third season of Crossing Lines as ICC Agent Ellie Delfont-Bogard. Since 2017 she appears in the Sky One drama Jamestown as Jocelyn Woodbryg, Mrs., later Widow, Samuel Castell.

Filmography

Film

Television

References

External links
 
 

1991 births
Living people
21st-century English actresses
Actors from Northamptonshire
Actresses from Manchester
English film actresses
English television actresses
People from Kettering
People from Wythenshawe